The town of Batang is the administrative capital of Batang Regency, Indonesia. It is a coastal town, situated immediately to the east of the large city of Pekalongan. The town forms a district within that regency, and covers an area of 34.35 km2. It had a population of 118,539 at the 2010 Census; the latest official estimate (as at mid 2019) is 127,832.

References

 

Populated places in Central Java
Regency seats of Central Java